The Caterpillar Wish (also known as Caterpillar Wish) is a 2006 Australian coming-of-age film, directed by Sandra Sciberras and produced by Kate Whitbread. The film stars an ensemble cast including Victoria Thaine, Susie Porter, and Philip Quast. It was filmed in and around Robe, South Australia. The Caterpillar Wish was released in Australia on 15 June 2006.

Plot
Emily is a seventeen-year-old schoolgirl who lives with her mother Susan. Emily never knew her father. According to her mother, he was a "tom cat"—a tourist who wandered into town one summer and was never seen again.

Susan is struggling to forget the past. She hasn't spoken to her fervently religious parents for years, not since she shamed the family by falling pregnant at fifteen.

Emily actively pursues a friendship with father-figure Stephen, who spends his days fixing boats at the harbour. But Stephen has his own troubles, constantly haunted by the past, unable to keep the loss of his wife and baby daughter from his thoughts.

Stephen's sister Elizabeth is married to the town policeman Carl. Elizabeth suspects Carl is being unfaithful but is scared to uncover the truth. Her son Joel has a secret love of his own.

When a Bible turns up with an intriguing inscription, Emily is the first to realise that hoping for change is not enough.

Cast

Reception
The Sunday Morning Herald said that "there is something enchanting about this unassuming film. You will ignore its flaws and be swept along by Thaine's delicate and touching performance."

Awards
2006 Australian Film Institute Awards: Best Actress in a Supporting Role (Susie Porter)

See also
 South Australian Film Corporation
 Robe

References

External links

2006 films
Australian coming-of-age drama films
2000s coming-of-age drama films
Australian independent films
Films set in South Australia
2006 independent films
2000s English-language films